Gary Robert Kloppenburg (born January 6, 1953) is an American basketball coach.

Early life and college career
Kloppenburg was born in 1953, when his father Bob Kloppenburg was head coach at Lindsay High School in Lindsay, California. When Bob Kloppenburg became head coach of California Western (later U.S. International) University, Gary Kloppenburg later attended La Jolla High School in La Jolla, California, graduating in 1971.

From 1972 to 1974, Gary Kloppenburg attended Feather River College and played on the basketball team. Kloppenburg then played semi-professional basketball in Europe, first with the English National League in 1975–76 then in the Netherlands in 1977. He then returned to the U.S. and enrolled at the University of California, San Diego, where he played on the UC San Diego Tritons men's basketball team in the 1978–79 and 1980–81 seasons. Kloppenburg graduated from UC San Diego in 1981 with a B.A. in Spanish literature.

Coaching career
Kloppenburg began his coaching career as an assistant men's basketball coach at Feather River College. In 1984, Kloppenburg became head coach. From 1988 to 1993, Kloppenburg was head women's basketball coach at Lassen Community College in Susanville, California, where he led the team to two consecutive California Community College Athletic Association titles in 1992 and 1993. From 1993 to 1999, Kloppenburg was head men's basketball coach at Lassen.

Kloppenburg served as an assistant coach with the Seattle Storm from 2000 through 2002 and Phoenix Mercury in 2003. He was an assistant coach of the Charlotte Bobcats of the National Basketball Association from 2004-2007, and an assistant coach of the Indiana Fever from 2008 through 2011 and Los Angeles Sparks in 2014.

Kloppenburg improved the Shock during his two-year tenure; nevertheless, he was fired after the 2013 season.

In 2017, Kloppenburg became an assistant for the Seattle Storm. Kloppenburg served as interim head coach on August 10, 2017 after head coach Jenny Boucek was fired. Kloppenburg stayed on the staff under new head coach Dan Hughes. In the 2019 season, Kloppenburg served as interim head coach during the time Hughes was recovering from cancer surgery. On June 29, 2020, Kloppenburg became head coach again after Hughes was determined to be at higher risk of illness from COVID-19.

Coaching record

WNBA

|-
| align="left" | Tulsa
| align="left" |2012
|34||9||25|||| align="center" |5th in West||—||—||—||—
| align="center" |Missed Playoffs
|-
| align="left" |Tulsa
| align="left" |2013
|34||11||23|||| align="center" |6th in West||—||—||—||—
| align="center" |Missed Playoffs
|-
| align="left" |Seattle
| align="left" |2017
|8||5||3|||| align="center" |5th in West||1||0||1||.000
| align="center" |Lost First Round
|- ! style="background:#FDE910;"
| align="left" |Seattle
| align="left" |2020
|22||18||4|||| align="center" |2nd in West||6||6||0||1.000
| align="center" |Won WNBA Championship
|-class="sortbottom"
| align="left" |Career
| ||98||43||55|||| ||7||6||1||

References

1953 births
Living people
American men's basketball players
American women's basketball coaches
Charlotte Bobcats assistant coaches
Continental Basketball Association coaches
Feather River College alumni
Indiana Fever coaches
Junior college men's basketball coaches in the United States
Junior college men's basketball players in the United States
Junior college women's basketball coaches in the United States
Los Angeles Sparks coaches
People from La Jolla, San Diego
Seattle Storm coaches
Basketball players from San Diego
Sportspeople from Tulare County, California
Tulsa Shock head coaches
UC San Diego Tritons men's basketball players
Women's National Basketball Association championship-winning head coaches
Women's National Basketball Association general managers